Tan Sri Dato' Seri Paduka Dr. Haji Shafie bin Haji Mohd Salleh (29 September 1946 – 11 September 2019) was a Malaysian politician who served as Higher Education Minister of Malaysia. Shafie Salleh was also the Chief Scout of Malaysia.

Education career

Shafie served as the Head of Research Centre, National Institute of Public Administration (INTAN) for five years. After that he was appointed the Division Secretary of the Ministry of Human Resources of Malaysia. Later on he was appointed the Undersecretary Research on Policy Analysis in the Malaysian Centre for Development Studies under the Prime Minister department.

Politics

Shafie was also the Member of Parliament for the district of Kuala Langat, Selangor. He was in the UMNO International Relations committee. Later he was appointed the Minister of Higher Education, Deputy Minister of Finance, and also the Parliament Secretary for the Minister of Finance.

During the 55th UMNO General Assembly, Shafie said that he will uphold the aspiration of the Malays. As the Malay special was attacked by the United Chinese School Committees Association of Malaysia Dong Zong. They are pushing the Malay segment on a defence position. Shafie Salleh in a defensive stance, said at the assembly that non-Bumiputras could not enter Universiti Teknologi MARA (UiTM) because it has been allocated to the Malays and it was agreed by all.

Election results

Honours
  :
 Officer of the Order of the Defender of the Realm (K.M.N.) (1993)
 Commander of the Order of Loyalty to the Crown of Malaysia (P.S.M.) – Tan Sri (2014)
 :
 Companion of the Order of the Crown of Selangor (S.M.S.) 
 Knight Companion of the Order of Sultan Salahuddin Abdul Aziz Shah (D.S.S.A.) – Dato' (1997)
 :
 Grand Knight of the Order of Sultan Ahmad Shah of Pahang (S.S.A.P.) – Dato' Sri (2005)

 Knight Commander of the Order of the Life of the Crown of Kelantan (S.J.M.K.) – Dato' (2006)

References

 

Malaysian people of Malay descent
1946 births
2019 deaths
People from Selangor
Malaysian Muslims
United Malays National Organisation politicians
Government ministers of Malaysia
Members of the Dewan Rakyat
Officers of the Order of the Defender of the Realm
Commanders of the Order of Loyalty to the Crown of Malaysia
Education ministers of Malaysia